Deep River Township may refer to the following places in the United States:

 Deep River Township, Poweshiek County, Iowa
 Deep River Township, Michigan
 Deer River Township, Itasca County, Minnesota

Township name disambiguation pages